Joe Comfort is a homeless man living in New Haven, Connecticut. He has been described as a "street legend".  He was featured in the Local Characters Trading Cards for New Haven, exhibited in 2005.  He earns money doing odd jobs including raking leaves, window washing, and repairs. He has also worked for Yale fraternities, cleaning up after parties.

Joe Comfort was at one point a carpenter for the Ringling Bros. and Barnum & Bailey Circus, and claimed to at one point be a licensed plumber. He attributes his lack of employment to potential employers' fear of having to pay workers compensation if his medical problems recur. He has epilepsy and Capgras delusion.

Advocacy

Joe Comfort has spoken out at public hearings against welfare cuts in the state of Connecticut.  He has also spoken out against harassment of homeless people by the police.

External links
 A video of Joe Comfort talking about himself
 Transcript of a committee hearing in the state of Connecticut, at which Joe Comfort spoke

References 

Homeless people
American people with disabilities
Living people
People from New Haven, Connecticut
People with epilepsy
Year of birth missing (living people)